Thottil Kuzhandhai is a 1995 Indian Tamil-language crime film directed by S. P. Muthuraman. The film stars Ramki and Ranjitha, with Anandaraj, Janagaraj, Vinu Chakravarthy, Kovai Sarala, Vadivukkarasi, Vivek and Karan playing supporting roles. It was released on 24 February 1995. The film turned out to be a failure at the box office. The film notably was the last directorial venture of Muthuraman.

Plot

The film began with the abandonment of a baby girl in a baby hatch and that baby was brought up in a government orphanage. Now, Raani (Ranjitha) is a gifted woman and she is proud of the orphanage. She then goes to a renowned college. There, Raani meets the village boy Pitchai (Ramki) and she changes him into a perfect city dweller, they slowly become best friends. After the studies, Pitchai and Raani fall in love with each other. Raani becomes a Sub-inspector of police while Pitchai becomes a district collector. Soon, they have to face the smuggler Rajarathnam (Anandaraj) and his son Murali (Karan). What transpires later forms the crux of the story.

Cast

Ramki as Pitchai
Ranjitha as Raani
Anandaraj as Rajarathnam
Janagaraj as Muthu
Vinu Chakravarthy as Sudalai, Pitchai's father
Kovai Sarala as Sarala
Vadivukkarasi
Vivek
Karan as Murali
Ganeshkar as Ganesh
Vellai Subbaiah
Silk Smitha
Ramlath
Ramu
Latha
Vikas Rishi
Murali Kumar

Soundtrack

The film score and the soundtrack were composed by Adithyan. The soundtrack, released in 1995, features 5 tracks with lyrics written by Panchu Arunachalam.

References

External links

1995 films
1990s Tamil-language films
Films directed by S. P. Muthuraman
Films with screenplays by Panchu Arunachalam